Dpy-19-like 2 (C. elegans) is a protein that in humans is encoded by the DPY19L2 gene.

Function 
The C. elegans gene dpy-19 belongs to the dpy ("dumpy" phenotype)
gene class and encodes DPY-19, transmembrane protein with C-linked mannosyltransferase activity.
In humans, it is highly expressed in testis, and is required for sperm head elongation and acrosome formation during spermatogenesis. Mutations in this gene are associated with an infertility disorder, spermatogenic failure type 9 (SPGF9).

References

Further reading 

 
 
 
 
 

Human proteins